The Nordic 44 is an American sailboat that was designed by Robert Perry as a racer-cruiser and first built in 1980.

Production
The design was built by Nordic Yachts in Bellingham, Washington, United States between 1980 and 1989, with 39 examples built. A luxury tax imposed in the US in 1991 caused the shut-down of the company.

Gary Nordvedt, the founder of Nordic Yachts established Norstar Yachts with his brother Steve, in Bellingham as a powerboat builder in 1994. He bought the old molds back and returned the Nordic 44 to production in 2009 as the Norstar 44, although the company went out of business in 2017.

Design
The Nordic 44 is a recreational keelboat, built predominantly of fiberglass, with a balsa cored deck and hull and with wood trim. It has a masthead sloop rig, a raked stem, a reverse transom, an skeg-mounted rudder controlled by a wheel and a fixed fin keel, shoal draft keel or stub keel and centerboard.

A shorter rig version was also available, with a mast about  lower.

The design has sleeping accommodation for six people, with a double "V"-berth in the bow cabin, an "L"-shaped settee and a straight settee in the main cabin and an aft cabin with a double berth on the port side. The galley is located on the port side just forward of the companionway ladder. The galley is "U"-shaped and is equipped with a three-burner stove and a double sink. A navigation station is opposite the galley, on the starboard side. There are two heads, one just aft of the bow cabin on the port side and one on the starboard side in the aft cabin.

Variants
Nordic 44
This model was introduced in 1980 and produced until 1989, with 39 boats built by Nordic Yachts. The full keel version displaces  and carries  of ballast. The centerboard-equipped model version displaces  and carries  of ballast.
Norstar 44
This model was introduced in 1995 and built until 2017 by Norstar Yachts. The boat is fitted with a Japanese Yanmar diesel engine.

See also
List of sailing boat types

Related development
Nordic 40

Similar sailboats
C&C 44
Corbin 39
Hunter 44
Gulfstar 43

References

Keelboats
1980s sailboat type designs
Sailing yachts
Sailboat type designs by Robert Perry
Sailboat types built by Norstar Yachts
Sailboat types built by Nordic Yachts